Grand Canyon is a valley in Warren County in the U.S. state of Missouri. The valley is an approximately four mile section of Charrette Creek which has a relatively wide floodplain (about 0.25 mile wide) between high canyon walls (about 300 feet high).

The name of the valley is an allusion to the Grand Canyon in Arizona.

References

Valleys of Warren County, Missouri
Valleys of Missouri